Sheikh Abdullah (born Thakur Das; June 21, 1874 – March 1965), also known as Papa Mian, was an Indian educationalist, social reformer, lawyer, founder of Women's College, Aligarh and a member of the Executive Council of the Aligarh Muslim University who served to the post from 1920 to 1928. Later in 1902, he was appointed to the All India Muhammadan Educational Conference as a secretary for women's section. He is primarily known for his contribution to the Muslim women education during British India period.

The recipient of numerous accolades, including a Padma Bhushan, he also served a member of United Province Legislative Council, a legislature of United Provinces of British India. During his time at AMU, he was associated with the Aligarh Movement. He worked at several posts at AMU such as Honorary Treasurer and University's court member from 1920 until he died in 1965.

Biography 
He was born as Thakur Das to Mehta Gurmukh Singh on June 21, 1874, in Poonch district of Jammu and Kashmir. He originally belonged to Brahmin community of Kashmir. Das converted to Islam in 1891 after he went to Lahore for higher education. He married Waheed Jahan Begum (also known as Ala Bi), daughter of Mirza Mohammad Ibrahim in 1902, with which he had six children, including five daughters and a son. His daughter Mumtaz Jahan was appointed to the Aligarh Muslim University's principal for Women's College where he served for about thirty years. Mehta Mastram, a lambardar of Bhantani village was his paternal grandfather. He was trained in Unani medicine by Hakeem Maulvi Nooruddin, a court physician to Maharaja of Kashmir. The physician was a member of the Ahmadiyya Muslim community, which Thakur Das also joined. Later when he went to United Province, he met with Sir Syed Ahmad Khan and adopted Sunni Islam, leaving the Ahmadiyya.

Education 
He originally started his basic education with Persian and Sanskrit language from a Maktab in Poonch. He did his early schooling from an uncertain school in his village, and later he went to Jammu where he received further education. In 1891, Abdullah did matriculation in Lahore and then obtained Bachelor's of Arts and Bachelor of Laws from the Aligarh university.

Awards and accolades 
In 1935, British India awarded him with an honorary title of "Khan Bahadur". After completing his education from the Aligarh, the university awarded him Doctor of Law, an honorary degree in 1950. In 1964, eighteen years later of the partition of the Indian subcontinent, the government of India awarded him Padma Bhushan, the third-highest Indian civilian award, in recognition of his contribution to the female education. The university women's college, Abdullah College is named after him.

Death and legacy 
He died in Uttar Pradesh, India in March 1965. His life is covered in a book titled Muslim Leadership and Women’s Education Uttar Pradesh, 1886–1947 written by Dr. Nasreen Ahmad.

The Abdullah School and Abdullah Hall, which comprises nine hostels for girls, in AMU are named after him.

In 1975, a documentary titled Papa Miya of Aligarh based on his life and directed by Khwaja Ahmad Abbas was released.

Books

References

Further reading 
 

1874 births
1965 deaths
Recipients of the Padma Bhushan in literature & education
Faculty of Law, Aligarh Muslim University alumni
Educators from Jammu and Kashmir
People from Poonch district, India
Founders of Indian schools and colleges
Indian women's rights activists
Converts to Islam from Hinduism
19th-century Indian Muslims
Aligarh Movement
Indian social reformers